Silas Peirce (February 15, 1793 – August 27, 1879) was an American grocer and politician who founded the wholesale grocer Silas Peirce & Co, in Boston, Massachusetts. in April, 1815. The grocery firm of Silas Peirce & Co., Ltd. lasted 111 years.

Political offices
Peirce served as Chairman and a member of the Boston Board of Aldermen.

Military service
From 1816 to 1822, Peirce served in the First Regiment, Third Brigade, Fourth Division of the Massachusetts Volunteer Militia. In 1821 Peirce joined the Ancient and Honorable Artillery Company of Massachusetts.

Archives and records
Silas Peirce & Company records at Baker Library Special Collections, Harvard Business School.

See also
 List of grocers

References

1793 births
1879 deaths
American chief executives
American grocers
People from Scituate, Massachusetts
Boston Board of Aldermen members
19th-century American politicians
19th-century American businesspeople